Cylindrepomus ballerioi is a species of beetle in the family Cerambycidae. It was described by Vitali in 2000. It is known from Malaysia.

References

Dorcaschematini
Beetles described in 2000